Melaleuca oldfieldii is a plant in the myrtle family, Myrtaceae, and is native to the south-west of Western Australia.  It is distinguished by its bright yellow flower heads but its distribution is restricted to one national park.

Description

The flowers are bright yellow and arranged in relatively large heads on the ends of branches which continue to grow after flowering. The stamens are arranged in five bundles around the flower, each bundle containing 8 to 12 stamens.

Taxonomy and naming
Melaleuca oldfieldii was first described in 1867 by George Bentham in "Flora Australiensis". The specific epithet (oldfieldii) is in recognition of the collector Augustus Oldfield who collected this species near the Murchison River.

Distribution and habitat
Melaleuca oldfieldii occurs  in the Kalbarri National Park in the Geraldton Sandplains biogeographic region, growing in sand or sandy clay, usually along streams.

Conservation
This species is classified as "Priority Two" by the Government of Western Australia Department of Parks and Wildlife meaning that is poorly known and from one or a few locations.

Uses

Horticulture
This species has proven difficult to maintain in cultivation except in special conditions but its glossy leaves and attractive yellow flowers indicate its potential as an ornamental. It requires excellent drainage.

Essential oils
The leaves of Melaleuca oldfieldii contain significant quantities of 1,8-cineole.

References

oldfieldii
Myrtales of Australia
Plants described in 1867
Endemic flora of Western Australia
Taxa named by Ferdinand von Mueller
Taxa named by George Bentham